Sar Daq Rural District is a rural district (dehestan) in Yunesi District, Bajestan County, Razavi Khorasan Province, Iran. At the 2006 census, its population was 3,509, in 853 families.  The rural district has 4 villages.

References 

Rural Districts of Razavi Khorasan Province
Bajestan County